Stephanie Meire (born 11 May 1971 in Bruges) is a Belgian actress and was Miss Belgium 1993 and her country's representative at Miss World 1993.  She has subsequently done acting work and hosted TV game shows including Puzzeltijd (Puzzle Time) on vtm.

References

Miss World 1993 delegates
Living people
1971 births
Belgian beauty pageant winners
Miss Belgium winners